Hayden Wilburn Hampton was a politician in the state of Georgia.

Hampton was a member of the Georgia House of Representatives for Gilmer County (1933) and the Georgia State Senate (1937-37/38 Ex., 1943).

Hampton was the child of Robert Tillman Hampton, another member of the Georgia House of Representatives (Fannin County, 1931).

Personal life
Hampton married Minnie Maybell Nichols on 1928 October 14. They had three children: Dora Aleece, Marion Frances, and Sherry June.

References

People from Gilmer County, Georgia
Georgia (U.S. state) state senators
Members of the Georgia House of Representatives
People from Fannin County, Georgia
1903 births
1966 deaths
20th-century American politicians